Nika Basariya (born 21 September 1999) is a Belarusian professional footballer who plays for Shevardeni-1906 Tbilisi.

References

External links 
 
 

1999 births
Living people
Footballers from Minsk
Belarusian footballers
Association football defenders
Belarusian expatriate footballers
Expatriate footballers in Spain
Expatriate footballers in Georgia (country)
UE Cornellà players
FC Luch Minsk (2012) players
FC Vitebsk players
FC Shevardeni-1906 Tbilisi players